Lee County is a county located in the U.S. state of Georgia. As of the 2020 census, the population was 33,163. Its county seat is Leesburg ans was established in 1825. Lee County is included in the Albany, GA Metropolitan Statistical Area.

History
The land for Lee, Muscogee, Troup, Coweta, and Carroll counties was ceded by the Creek people in the 1825 Treaty of Indian Springs.  The counties' boundaries were created by the Georgia General Assembly on June 9, but they were not named until December 14, 1826. The county was named in honor of Henry Lee III, popularly known as "Light-Horse Harry," the father of Confederate general Robert E. Lee. On January 29, 1916, five African American men were lynched; they were taken from the Worth county jail and hung, their bodies riddled with bullets. The Leesburg Stockade occurred in Lee County.

Geography
Most of the western three-quarters of Lee County is located in the Kinchafoonee-Muckalee sub-basin of the ACF River Basin (Apalachicola-Chattahoochee-Flint River Basin). The eastern quarter of the county is located in the Middle Flint River sub-basin of the same ACF River Basin, while a very small corner in the south of Lee County is located in the Lower Flint River sub-basin of the same larger ACF River Basin. An even smaller southwestern corner is located in the Ichawaynochaway Creek sub-basin of the ACF River Basin.

Major highways

  U.S. Route 19
  U.S. Route 19 Bypass
  U.S. Route 82
  State Route 3
  State Route 3 Bypass
  State Route 32
  State Route 91
  State Route 118
  State Route 133
  State Route 195
  State Route 377
  State Route 520

Adjacent counties
 Sumter County (north)
 Crisp County (northeast)
 Worth County (east)
 Dougherty County (south)
 Terrell County (west)

Demographics

2000 census
As of the census of 2000, there were 24,757 people, 8,229 households, and 6,797 families living in the county. There were 8,813 housing units at an average density of 25 per square  mile (10/km2). The racial makeup of the county was 82.24% White, 15.50% Black or African American, 0.24% Native American, 0.84% Asian, 0.01% Pacific Islander, 0.48% from other races, and 0.68% from two or more races. 1.21% of the population were Hispanic or Latino of any race.

There were 8,229 households, out of which 48.30% had children under the age of 18 living with them, 65.80% were married couples living together, 13.00% had a female householder with no husband present, and 17.40% were non-families. 14.30% of all households were made up of individuals, and 4.30% had someone living alone who was 65 years of age or older. The average household size was 2.91 and the average family size was 3.21.

In the county, the population was spread out, with 30.70% under the age of 18, 8.50% from 18 to 24, 33.20% from 25 to 44, 21.30% from 45 to 64, and 6.30% who were 65 years of age or older. The median age was 33 years. For every 100 females, there were 102.10 males. For every 100 females age 18 and over, there were 100.20 males.

The median income for a household in the county was $48,600, and the median income for a family was $53,132. Males had a median income of $39,848 versus $25,715 for females. The per capita income for the county was $19,897. About 6.50% of families and 8.20% of the population were below the poverty line, including 10.50% of those under age 18 and 11.70% of those aged 65 or over.

2010 census
As of the 2010 United States Census, there were 28,298  people, 9,706  households, and 7,740  families living in the county. The racial makeup of the county was 76.9% white, 18.6% black or African American, 2.2% Asian, 0.3% American Indian, 0.1% Pacific islander, 0.6% from other races, and 1.4% from two or more races. Those of Hispanic or Latino origin made up 2.0% of the population. In terms of ancestry, 15.1% were American, 12.3% were Irish, 10.3% were German, and 9.1% were English.

Of the 9,706  households, 44.4% had children under the age of 18 living with them, 62.1% were married couples living together, 13.6% had a female householder with no husband present, 20.3% were non-families, and 16.4% of all households were made up of individuals. The average household size was 2.83 and the average family size was 3.17. The median age was 36.0 years.

The median income for a household in the county was $59,811 and the median income for a family was $67,943. Males had a median income of $49,213 versus $34,880 for females. The per capita income for the county was $23,867. About 7.5% of families and 8.2% of the population were below the poverty line, including 9.2% of those under age 18 and 8.2% of those age 65 or over.

2020 census

As of the 2020 United States census, there were 33,163 people, 10,226 households, and 7,872 families residing in the county.

Education

Public schools are operated by the Lee County School District. Lee County High School is the sole high school of the district.

Politics
Historically, Lee County was part of the solidly Democratic Solid South where control of the dominant black population dictated unified white voting for Democratic candidates due to the Republican association with Reconstruction and black political power. However, with a combination of the Great Migration and white in-migration, the black share of the county's population has declined and it is now powerfully Republican, having voted Republican in every presidential election since 1964, with the exception of 1968 and 1976 when it backed Southern “favorite sons” George Wallace and Jimmy Carter.

Communities
 Leesburg (county seat)
 Smithville

See also

 National Register of Historic Places listings in Lee County, Georgia
List of counties in Georgia

References

External links
 Official Website

 
Georgia (U.S. state) counties
1825 establishments in Georgia (U.S. state)
Populated places established in 1825
Albany metropolitan area, Georgia